K. Malaisamy is an Indian politician from Tamil Nadu. He served as a Member of Parliament in Rajya Sabha, the upper house of the Indian Parliament.

Malaisamy was a member of the All India Anna Dravida Munnetra Kazhagam (AIADMK) until 2014. He was expelled from AIADMK on 15 May 2014 for suggesting that the party's chief Jayalalithaa may ally with Narendra Modi of NDA.

References

External links
 Profile on Rajya Sabha website

Rajya Sabha members from Tamil Nadu
All India Anna Dravida Munnetra Kazhagam politicians
Living people
India MPs 1999–2004
People from Ramanathapuram district
Lok Sabha members from Tamil Nadu
Year of birth missing (living people)